Pennsylvania's 34th congressional district was one of Pennsylvania's districts of the United States House of Representatives.  It covered area north of the city of Pittsburgh, Pennsylvania.

History
This district was created in 1913.  Until 1923 the seat was held "at-large".  The district was eliminated in 1943.

List of members representing the district

References

 Congressional Biographical Directory of the United States 1774–present

34
Former congressional districts of the United States
Constituencies established in 1923
1923 establishments in Pennsylvania
Constituencies disestablished in 1943
1943 disestablishments in Pennsylvania